Armenian Genocide Remembrance Day ( Mets Yegherrni zoheri hishataki or) or Armenian Genocide Memorial Day is a public holiday in Armenia and the Republic of Artsakh and is observed by the Armenian diaspora on 24 April. It is held annually to commemorate the victims of the Armenian genocide of 1915. It was a series of massacres and starvation of 1.5 million Armenians by the Ottomans. In Yerevan, the capital of Armenia, hundreds of thousands of people walk to the Tsitsernakaberd Genocide Memorial to lay flowers at the eternal flame.

History 

The date 24 April commemorates the deportation of Armenian intellectuals on 24 April 1915 from Constantinople (present-day Istanbul). The first commemoration, organised by a group of Armenian Genocide survivors, was held in Istanbul in 1919 at the local St. Trinity Armenian church. Many prominent figures in the Armenian community participated in the commemoration. Following its initial commemoration in 1919, the date became the annual day of remembrance for the Armenian Genocide.

On 9 April 1975, the US House of Representatives passed Joint Resolution 148 designating 24 April as a National Day of Remembrance of Man's Inhumanity to Man. 
The Resolution commemorated the victims of genocide, especially those of Armenian ancestry who succumbed to the genocide perpetrated in 1915, The resolution however failed to pass in the U.S. Senate Judiciary Committee due to President Gerald R. Ford’s strong opposition to what he saw as a threat to the country's strategic alliance with Turkey.

In 1988, Soviet Armenia formally adopted 24 April as a public day of commemoration.

In 1997 in the US, the California State Assembly declared 24 April as a Day of Remembrance for the Armenian Genocide of 1915–1923, and for the victims of the Sumgait Pogroms of 1988 and Baku Riots of 1990.

In 2007, Argentina passed National Law 26199, designating 24 April as "Day of Action for Tolerance and Respect among Peoples", in which Armenian Argentines are excused from work.

In 2015, the House of Commons of Canada unanimously passed Motion M-587, proposed by Brad Butt, marking April to be Genocide Remembrance, Condemnation and Prevention Month, and designating 24 April as Armenian Genocide Memorial Day.

In 2019, France marked its first national commemoration of the genocide, with French president Emmanuel Macron declaring 24 April "a national day of remembrance of the Armenian genocide", fulfilling a campaign pledge.

In 2021, US President Joe Biden recognized the genocide on 24 April, fulfilling a campaign pledge.

See also
 Armenian genocide recognition
 100th anniversary of the Armenian Genocide
Armenian genocide denial
 "I Apologize" campaign
 National Sorry Day
 Truth and reconciliation commission
 Vergangenheitsbewältigung

References

External links

 The Official Armenian Genocide Centennial Website 

Genocide remembrance days
Armenian genocide commemoration
April observances
Public holidays in Armenia
Public holidays in the Republic of Artsakh